Apple Configurator 2 is an application developed by Apple Inc. and is available for free download on the Mac App Store. It was first launched in 2012. It replaces the Apple Configurator, which was first launched in March 2012, and iPhone Configuration Utility.

The application allows for mass-configuration of  iOS, iPadOS and tvOS devices for business and educational organizations.  It provides remote management by an IT administrator to help set up and maintain standard configuration and software across a number of devices.

References

MacOS-only software made by Apple Inc.
2012 software
Apple Inc. software
MacOS